Morrisons Cove (also referred to as Morrison Cove or Morrison's Cove), is an eroded anticlinal valley in Blair and Bedford counties of central Pennsylvania, United States, extending from Evitts Mountain near New Enterprise, north to the Frankstown Branch Juniata River at Williamsburg. Almost entirely enclosed by these mountains, the only openings in the cove are at Loysburg Gap in the south, McKee Gap in the west, and at Williamsburg to the north. The floor of the valley is mostly level, with many large fertile farm fields. The southern end of the valley drains to the Raystown Branch Juniata River via Yellow Creek through Loysburg Gap, and the northern end drains to the Frankstown Branch, via Clover Creek.

There are four boroughs located in Morrisons Cove and they are:
 Roaring Spring
 Martinsburg
 Williamsburg
 Woodbury

There are seven townships located in Morrisons Cove and they are the following:
 South Woodbury Township, Bedford County
 Woodbury Township, Bedford County
 Bloomfield Township, Bedford County
 Taylor Township, Blair County
 North Woodbury Township, Blair County
 Huston Township, Blair County
 Woodbury Township, Blair County

Altoona–Blair County Airport is located in Morrisons Cove. Pennsylvania Route 36 is the main north/south route through the valley from Loysburg Gap to McKee Gap. Pennsylvania Route 866 branches off PA-36 at Woodbury to Martinsburg.

History 
Morrisons Cove is often mentioned as a landmark in early wills and records of importance. Wills Creek Valley and Friend's Cove are also in this section of the state, and were well known to the early settlers.

Tornado

On May 22, 1949, the same storm system that caused the F1 tornado in Altoona also spawned an F1 tornado in the Morrisons Cove area. The tornado initially touched down south of Curryville where it downed several large trees and destroyed a barn. The tornado moved north east, striking Henrietta and Millerstown. Several homes were unroofed and barns were destroyed, in both areas. One of the destroyed barns was a 150-year-old stone barn. A car was destroyed and a church had several windows blown out and had its chimney ripped off. A 17-year-old girl was injured in Henrietta, when the window she was standing at shattered. The damage caused by this tornado is consistent of winds .

A map made by Dr. Ted Fujita, in 1974, of all of the tornadoes in the U.S between 1930 and 1974, shows this tornado as an F1 on the Fujita Scale.

References

External links
Morrison's Cove News, Updated Daily
Morrisons Cove Herald's website
Morrisons Cove's Community Website - News and Information for Morrisons Cove, Pennsylvania
The Park at Morrisons Cove - 201 S. Walnut St., Martinsburg, PA

Regions of Pennsylvania
Valleys of Pennsylvania
Landforms of Blair County, Pennsylvania
Landforms of Bedford County, Pennsylvania